Innerloop Studios (commonly just Innerloop) was a Norwegian video game developer operating from 1996 to 2003. The company was founded as Innerloop Technologies in May 1996 by a group of ex-employees of the Oslo-based video game company Funcom. After entering into a partnership with the video game developer and publisher Eidos Interactive, Innerloop merged with DiMaga Studios in 1997 and changed its name to Innerloop Studios to reflect the merger. In the fall of 2000, Swedish electronic entertainment company Vision Park acquired the studio. In 2002, Innerloop once again became an independent company before shutting its doors in June 2003. The company was unable to obtain funding to create future titles, so they finally decided to shut down the studio.

History
Company staff numbers ranged between 15 and 25 at various times throughout the company's existence.

Innerloop was widely known for its graphics technology, first on display in the flight simulator JSF - Joint Strike Fighter, and its most popular games series 'I.G.I'. The sports game Sega Extreme Sports for Sega Dreamcast, Innerloop chose to develop exclusively for the PC platform, since their graphics technology would not work on consoles without considerable compromises to performance.

Co-founder Henning Rokling was the company's managing director until the studio shut down its operations in 2003. In addition to working with Eidos Interactive, Innerloop also worked with Infogrames, Sega, Empire Interactive and Codemasters.

Games

References

Video game development companies
Video game companies established in 1996
Video game companies disestablished in 2003
Defunct software companies of Iceland
Defunct video game companies
Video game companies of Norway
2003 disestablishments in Norway
Norwegian companies established in 1996